Taman Negeri Rompin or Rompin State Park is located within Rompin District, Pahang, Taman Negeri Rompin Pahang (TNRP) spans an area of 31,797 hectares, consisting of lowland mixed dipterocarp forest, edaphic hill forest formation and rivers. The geological history of the park dates back at least 248 million years to the Permian-Carboniferous age, which the rock types include low grade metamorphics, igneous, granite and sedimentary sequence that has shaped the ecosystem within the protected area.

The forest of Taman Negeri Rompin includes species of plants such as Livistona endauensis., a type of fan palm endemic to the forest reserve of Endau-Rompin. Due to the diversity of plant species within this reserved forest, hundreds of species of birds, mammals, fish, reptiles, amphibians and insects have been documented, with several of those are threatened or endangered.

Flora and fauna
Endau-Rompin is among the Central Forest Spine (CFS) of Peninsular Malaysia. The wildlife recorded includes Malayan Tiger (Panthera tigris jacksonii), though the number of the individual is unknown. It was also recorded that a tiger has preyed upon the cub of Sunbear (Helarctos malayanus), by a camera trap. In total, 6 species of cats have been recorded within the state park. Other animals include the arboreal mammals, the White-handed Gibbon (Hylobates lar), Malayan Tapir (Tapirus indicus). Bearded Pigs (Sus barbatus), also recorded which at Peninsular Malaysia the species occur only at Johor and the southern of Pahang.

The lowland and hill dipterocarp forest flora support diverse species of birds that includes both diurnal and nocturnal such as babblers, hornbills, flycatchers, owls, broadbills and a variety of migratory birds. The list of birds provided is based on the sighting recorded within the park

PICIFORMES
 Checker-throated Woodpecker (Chrysophlegma mentalis)
 Buff-rumped Woodpecker (Meiglyptes tristis)
 Buff-necked Woodpecker (Meiglyptes tukki)
 Crimson-winged Woodpecker (Picus puniceus)
 White-bellied Woodpecker (Dryocopus javanensis)
 Banded Woodpecker (Chrysophlegma miniaceum)
 Grey-and-buff Woodpecker (Hemicircus sordidus)
 Maroon Woodpecker (Blythipicus rubiginosus)

CUCULIFORMES
 Raffle’s Malkoha (Rhinortha chlorophaeus)
 Red-billed Malkoha (Zanclostomus javanicus)
 Black-bellied Malkoha (Rhopodytes diardi)
 Malaysian Hawk-cuckoo (Hierococcyx fugax)
 Drongo Cuckoo (Surniculus lugubris)

APODIFORMES
 Whiskered Treeswift (Hemiprocne comata)

PASSERIFORMES
 Grey-bellied Bulbul (pycnonotus cyaniventris)
 Buff-vented Bulbul (Iole olivacea)
 Cream-vented Bulbul (Pycnonotus simplex)
 Yellow-bellied Bulbul (Alophoixus phaeocephalus)
 Hairy-backed Bulbul (Tricholestes criniger) 
 Finsch’s Bulbul (Iole finschii)
 Grey-cheeked Bulbul (Alophoixus tephrogenys)
 Straw-headed Bulbul (Pycnonotus zeylanicus)
 Asian Fairy Bluebird (Irena puella)
 Grey-headed Canary-flycatcher (Culicicapa ceylonensis)
 White-rumped Shama (Copsychus malabaricus)
 Oriental Magpie Robin (Copsychus saularis)
 Green Broadbill (Calyptomena viridis)
 Black-and-red Broadbill (Cymbirhynchus macrorhynchos)
 Black-and-yellow Broadbill (Eurylaimus ochromalus)
 Banded Broadbill (Eurylaimus javanicus)
 White-bellied Munia (Lonchura leucogastra)
 Amur Paradise Flycatcher (Terpsiphone incei)
 Pale Blue Flycatcher (Cyornis unicolor)
 Rufous-chested Flycatcher (Ficedula dumetoria)
 Green Iora (Aegithina viridissima)
 Great Iora (Aegithina lafresnayei)
 Lesser Cuckooshrike (Coracina fimbriata)
 Black-winged Flycatcher-shrike (Hemipus hirundinaceus)
 Rufous-tailed Tailorbird (Orthotomus sericeus)
 Common Tailorbird (Orthotomus sutorius)
 Dark-necked Tailorbird (Orthotomus atrogularis)
 Greater Green Leafbird (Chloropsis sonnerati)
 Blue-winged Leafbird (Chloropsis cochinchinensis)
 Grey-breasted Spiderhunter (Arachnothera affinis)
 Purple-naped Spiderhunter (Hypogramma hypogrammicum)
 Little Spiderhunter (Arachnothera longirostra)
 Yellow-eared Spiderhunter (Arachnothera chrysogenys)
 Hill Myna (Gracula religiosa)
 Crested Myna (Acridotheres cristatellus)
 Chestnut-naped Forktail (Enicurus ruficapillus)
 White-crowned Forktail (Enicurus leschenault)
 Pin-striped Tit-babbler (Macronus gularis)
 Fluffy-backed Tit-babbler (Macronus ptilosus)
 Chestnut-backed Scimitar-babbler (Pomatorhinus montanus)
 Moustached Babbler (Malacopteron magnirostre)
 Chestnut-winged Babbler (Stachyris nigriceps)
 White-bellied Erpornis (Erpornis zantholeuca)
 Yellow-breasted Flowerpecker (Prionochilus maculatus)
 Crimson-breasted Flowerpecker (Prionochilus percussus)
 Orange-bellied Flowerpecker (Dicaeum trigonostigma)
 Scarlet-breasted Flowerpecker (Prionochilus thoracicus)
 Fiery Minivet (Pericrocotus igneus)
 Scarlet Minivet (Pericrocotus speciosus)
 Brown Fulvetta (Alcippe brunneicauda)
 Spotted Fantail (Rhipidura perlata)
 Rufous-winged Philentoma (Philentoma pyrhoptera)
 Sultan Tit (Melanochlora sultanea)
 Dark-throated Oriole (Oriolus xanthonotus)

CORACIIFORMES
 Oriental Dwarf Kingfisher (Ceyx eithaca)
 Stork-billed Kingfisher (Pelargopsis capensis)
 Red-bearded Bee-eater (Nyctyornis amictus)
 Banded Kingfisher (Lacedo pulchella)

BUCEROTIFORMES
 Wrinkled Hornbill (Aceros corrugatus)
 Black Hornbill (Anthracoceros malayanus)
 Helmeted Hornbill (Rhinoplax vigil)

ACCIPITRIFORMES
 Lesser Fish Eagle (Ichtyophaga humilis)
 Crested Serpent Eagle (Spilornis cheela)
 Rufous-bellied Eagle (Lophotriorchis kienerii)

PSITTACIFORMES
 Blue-crowned Hanging-parrot (Loriculus galgulus)
 Blue-rumped Parrot (Psittinus cyanurus)

TROGONIFORMES
 Scarlet-rumped Trogon (Herpactes devaucelii)

COLUMBIFORMES
 Little Green Pigeon (Treron olax)
 Thicked-billed Green Pigeon (Treton curvirostra)
 Green Imperial Pigeon (Ducula aenea)
 Emerald Dove (Chalcophaps indica)

STRIGIFORMES
 Barred Eagle-Owl (Bubo sumatranus)
 Buffy Fish-owl (Ketupa ketupu)

References

External links
Park website

Year of establishment missing
Rompin District
Geography of Pahang
Parks in Malaysia